Blackbeard is a 2006 American adventure-drama television miniseries based on the pirate Blackbeard, directed by Kevin Connor from a screenplay written by Bryce Zabel. It premiered on Hallmark Channel on June 17, 2006. The miniseries was shot on location in Thailand and the town of New Providence was built on a coconut plantation, and includes many factual names and places, but it is essentially a fictional story since Blackbeard's most notable exploits took place in North Carolina.

Plot 
In the first quarter of the 18th century, Blackbeard, otherwise Edward Teach was seen as the most notorious and dangerous seafaring pirate of all, plying his trade around the West Indies and the eastern coast of England’s North American colonies in his ship Queen Anne's Revenge. Blackbeard wreaks havoc looking for Captain Kidd's treasure, and his dark presence causes controversy in the port town of New Providence, especially for Governor Charles Eden and his adopted daughter Charlotte, who is being wooed by Lieutenant Robert Maynard.

Cast
Angus Macfadyen as Blackbeard
Mark Umbers as Lieutenant Robert Maynard
Richard Chamberlain as Governor Charles Eden
Jessica Chastain as Charlotte Ormand
Stacy Keach as Captain Benjamin Hornigold
Clement von Franckenstein as Admiral Joseph Pennington
Rachel Ward as Sally Dunbar
Anthony Green as Israel Hands
Jasper Britton as William Howard
Niko Nicotera as Moses Hobbs
Robin Strasser as Felice Richmond
 Nicholas Farrell as Tobias Knight
 David Winters as Silas Bridges
Dom Hetrakul as Seng
Nigel Terry as Calico Billy
Steven Elder as Lt. Jack Spector
Paul Brightwell as Captain Ellis Brand
Andrew Smith as Benjamin Dow
Love Nystrom as Captain William Kidd
Stuart Lounton as Cordingly
Wendy Mae Brown as Lulu
Jake Curran as Joseph Prescott
Robert Willox as Snake Leavitt
Patrick Regis as Thatch
Alan Shearman as Enoch Sanborn
Danny Midwinter as Elias Ransom
Bill Fellows as Dr Peter Bruce
Christopher Clyde-Green as Black Caesar
Ken Forge as Phillips
Marion Valtas as Maddy
Greg Jorgensen as Panhandler
Jonathan Samson as Woodward
James Moody as Two-Face Askin
David Ismalone as Captain Jean D'Ocier
Jake Anthony as Minister 
Greg Stefaniuk as Merchant Captain
Shaun Delaney as John Noble
James David McClurg as Shiny
Keith Lounton as Carlton
Johann Bento as French First Mate
Thomas Kollon as Big John
Emma Passos as Mother 
Damian Mavis as First Robber

Production
Despite being about the miniseries, the serial is largely a remake of Captain Blood (1935). It was filmed by Living Films on location around Seattle, Washington.

Home media 
It was released on DVD by Echo Bridge Entertainment on July 11, 2006. It was later released in an international DVD edition re-titled Pirates: The True Story of Blackbeard, though by the writers own admission little of the screenplay was actually true.

References

External links 
 Blackbeard at Echo Bridge Entertainment's website
 
 
 Blackbeard on HallmarkChannel.tv
 Blackbeard: Sail Ho! – review & behind-the-scenes information
 Out to sea, Elite Magazine

2006 American television series debuts
2006 American television series endings
2000s American drama television series
American adventure television series
2000s American television miniseries
Cultural depictions of Blackbeard
English-language television shows